Stuart Weir (born 1938) is a British journalist, writer, and Visiting Professor with the Government Department at the University of Essex. He was previously the Director of the Democratic Audit, formerly a research unit of the University of Essex. Weir was a founder of the constitutional reform pressure group Charter 88, and was editor of the weekly political magazine the New Statesman from 1987–91, having previously been deputy editor of New Society, which merged with the New Statesman in 1988. Weir was editor of the Labour Party's monthly magazine New Socialist in the mid-1980s.

Publications

References

External links
 Stuart Weir articles at New Statesman
 Stuart Weir articles at OpenDemocracy.net

1938 births
Living people
British male journalists
Academics of the University of Essex
New Statesman people